Randall Steve Coffield (born December 12, 1953) is a former professional American football player who played in three NFL seasons from 1976 to 1979 for the Seattle Seahawks and the New York Giants.

References 

1953 births
Living people
Hialeah Senior High School alumni
Players of American football from Miami
American football linebackers
Florida State Seminoles football players
Seattle Seahawks players
New York Giants players